Cyrillus-Camillus Barbary (4 August 1899 – 16 September 2004) was the last known Belgian veteran of the First World War. He was born in Klerken in West Flanders. Barbary worked as a mason and emigrated to the United States with his wife Emma in 1923. The couple had three children. He visited Belgium for the last time in 1997. 

As a result of his emigration, he was ignored by official commemorations of the last surviving veterans in Belgium. Paul Ooghe was widely reported to have been the last surviving Belgian veteran at the time of his death in 2001. Barbary died in Detroit on 16 September 2004 at the age of 105.

See also 
 List of last surviving World War I veterans by country

References

1899 births
2004 deaths
Belgian centenarians
Men centenarians
Belgian emigrants to the United States
Belgian Army personnel of World War I
People from Houthulst
Belgian Army soldiers